Red Devil or Red Devils may refer to:

Places 
 Red Devil, Alaska, United States

People
 Ii Naomasa (1561–1602), Japanese general known as the Red Devil, and the unit he led was known as the Red Devils
 Camille Jenatzy, a Belgian race car driver nicknamed Le Diable Rouge (The Red Devil)
 Manfred von Richthofen, a German fighter ace nicknamed Le Diable Rouge (The Red Devil) by his enemies

Animals 
 Red devil cichlid (disambiguation), two species of cichlid fish from genus Amphilophus
 Humboldt squid, a carnivorous marine creature (Diablo Rojo) named for its tendency to flash red and white when on the attack

Drugs 
Alprazolam, trade name Xanax, a anxiety and panic disorder drug with a history of counterfeit pills nicknamed "red devil" for being red with "666" on one side
 Doxorubicin, trade name Adriamycin, a chemotherapy drug nicknamed "red devil" for its deep red color and dangerous side effects
 Secobarbital, trade name Seconal, a barbiturate sedative-hypnotic drug nicknamed "red devil" for its packaging in red capsules

Art, entertainment, and media

Literature
"Red Devils" (story), a 1921 Soviet adventure story by Pavel Blyakhin

Film
Red Devils (film), a 1923 Soviet adventure film directed by Ivan Perestiani based on the story by Pavel Blyakhin

Fictional characters 
 Red Devil (comics), aka Kid Devil, a DC comics superhero and former sidekick of the Blue Devil
 Reddevil, an alias of the Daredevil character from Lev Gleason Publications
 Red Devil, the main villain of season 1 of Scream Queens

Music

Groups
 Red Devil (punk band), contemporary Philadelphia prog-punk band
 The Red Devils (blues band), 1980s-1990s Los Angeles-based blues band
 The Red Devils, 1920s Hawaiian band featuring "King" Bennie Nawahi

Songs
 "Red Devil", a song by Yngwie Malmsteen from the album Perpetual Flame

Brands and enterprises
 Red Devil Energy Drink
 Red Devil, Inc., a manufacturer of caulking, glazing, sealants and related products in Pryor, Oklahoma
 Red Devil Cayenne Pepper Sauce, a brand made by Trappey's Hot Sauce
 Red Devils Motorcycle Club, a prominent puppet club of the Hells Angels

Military

France
 Diables Rouges, nickname of the 152nd Infantry Regiment of the French Army
 Diables Rouges, nickname of SPA 160 a former unit of the French Air Force

Italy
 Diavoli Rossi ("Red Devils"), nickname of the Sassari Mechanized Brigade
 Diavoli Rossi ("Red Devils"), a former aerobatics display team of the Italian Air Force
 Diavoli Rossi ("Red Devils"), nickname of the 2nd Squadron of the Italian Air Force in World War II
 "Red Devils", British nickname for Italian SRCM Mod. 35 grenades

United Kingdom
 "Red Devils", nickname of the Parachute Regiment, of the British Army 
 Red Devils (Parachute Regiment), the regiment's parachute display team
 "Red Devils", nickname of the 1st Parachute Brigade (United Kingdom), a British airborne brigade active during World War II

United States
 "Red Devils", nickname of the 508th Infantry Regiment (United States)
 "Red Devils", nickname of the 5th Infantry Division (United States)
 "Red Devils", nickname of the 92nd Field Artillery Regiment
 "Rice's Red Devils", nickname of the 89th Tank Battalion
 "Red Devils", nickname of the 702nd Tank Battalion
 "Fightin' Red Devils", nickname of the 40th Pursuit Squadron of the United States Army Air Corps
 "Red Devils", nickname of the 107th Fighter Squadron
 "Red Devils", nickname of the 96th Bomb Squadron
 "Red Devil", nickname of the 555th Bomb Squadron of the United States Army Air Forces
 "Red Devils", nickname of defunct navy fighter squadron VF-772
 "Red Devils", nickname of defunct navy bombing squadron VB-5
 "Red Devils", nickname of defunct navy torpedo squadron VT-13
 "Red Devils", nickname of VMFA-232, a U.S. Marine fighter attack squadron

Other countries
Diablos Rojos (Red Devils), a helicopter anti-drug task force of the Bolivian military
Diablos Rojos (Red Devils), a defunct aerobatic team of the Peruvian Air Force
"Red Devils", nickname of the Parachute Regiment of the Indian Army
Roter Teufel (Red Devil), nickname of German submarine U-552
Tercera Compañia de Infantería Diablo Rojo (Third Red Devil Infantry Company) a unit of the defunct Panamanian Defense Forces
"The Red Devils", the aerobatic team of the Belgian armed forces

Sports teams

Association football

Clubs
 1. FC Kaiserslautern, German football club
 Al Ahly SC, Egyptian football club
 América de Cali, Colombian football club
 Bulancakspor, Turkish football club
 C.D. Diablos Rojos, a Peruvian football team
 Club Atlético Independiente, Argentine football club
 Crawley Town F.C., English football club
 Deportivo Toluca F.C., a Mexican football club
 FC Rouen, a French football club
 Grazer AK, Austrian football club
 Hapoel Tel Aviv F.C., Israeli football club
 Manchester United F.C., English football club
 Nkana F.C., Zambian football club
 Urawa Red Diamonds, Japanese football club

National teams
 Belgium national football team, (since 1906) The Red Devils
 Congo national football team
 South Korea national football team, (since 1995) Red Devils
 Red Devils (supporters club), the official supporting group of the Korean Republic national football team

Other sports
 Arizona Red Devils, an American women's gridiron football team
 Canterbury Red Devils, a New Zealand ice hockey team
 Los Angeles Red Devils, an American defunct basketball team
 Montpellier Red Devils, a French rugby league club
 Red Devil Sport Club, a Russian-based MMA training team/association
 Salford Red Devils, an English rugby league club
 Scuderia Ferrari, a Formula One team based in Italy

School nicknames and mascots 
Atkins High School (Arkansas)
 Augusta High School (Arkansas)
 Druid Hills High School, Atlanta, Georgia
 East Valley High School (Yakima, Washington)
 Eureka College, Eureka, Illinois
Freeport High School (New York), Freeport, New York
 Germantown High School, Germantown, Tennessee
 Green Bay East High School, Green Bay, Wisconsin
 Grosse Ile High School, Grosse Ile, Michigan
 Luther L. Wright High School (Ironwood, Michigan)
 Halls High School, Knoxville, Tennessee
 Hinsdale Central High School, Hinsdale, Illinois
 Hunterdon Central Regional High School, Flemington, New Jersey
 Huntley Project High School, Worden, Montana
 Jackson High School (Jackson, Georgia)
 Jacksonville High School (Arkansas)
 Kathleen High School (Lakeland, Florida)
 Lancaster High School (Virginia)
 Lowell High School (Lowell, Indiana)
 Maplesville High School, Maplesville, Alabama
 Marion-Franklin High School, Columbus, Ohio
 Mountain Pine School, Mountain Pine, Arkansas
 Murtaugh High School, Murtaugh, Idaho
 Peekskill High School, Peekskill, New York
 Pike High School, Indianapolis, Indiana
 Pomona High School, Pomona, California
 Richmond High School (Richmond, Indiana)
 Ridge High School, Basking Ridge, New Jersey
 San Francisco University High School, San Francisco, California
 Springville High School (Utah)
 Tippecanoe High School, Tipp City, Ohio
 Washington International School, Washington DC
 West Lafayette Junior-Senior High School, West Lafayette, Indiana
 Owensboro Middle School, Owensboro, Kentucky 
 Owensboro High School, Owensboro, Kentucky

Transportation
 Red Devil (interurban), a high-speed interurban railcar 
 Baldwin Red Devil, an early series of airplanes built by Thomas Scott Baldwin
 South African Class 26 4-8-4, a South African locomotive nicknamed Red Devil

Other uses 
 The Red Devils, aerobatics team led by the late Charlie Hillard
 Geosesarma hagen, a species of crab which is sometimes called "red devil" in the aquarium trade